Justicia mayor was a title bestowed upon a person in 19th century Spanish Empire which authorized him to perform law enforcement and judicial functions within a town, city of region.  It is similar to the position of sheriff in some jurisdictions.

Description 
The 13th century Castillian-Leon Court started to use the term "alguacil" to designate the Alférez del rey deputy for judicial matters. However in the 14th century the term "Justicia mayor" was used to refer to the same officer. The position implied being the executioner of King's and/or Judges. The Justicia mayor was assisted by other "alguaciles menores" (deputies). The Justicia mayor was the maximum authority in the territory of its jurisdiction.

The functions of the Justicia mayor in the King's household were as follows:
 Judicial:
 Ensure the tribunals possessed the necesario elements to facilitate the judicial proceedings.
 Apprehend those who were to be judged and take custody of them.
 Follow through on the punishments ordered by the King or his Judges.
 Carry out sentences, whether civil or criminal.
 Law enforcement:
 Detain and jail those charged with an offense
 Prevention of crime.
 Impose punishment according to the criminal code of justice.
 Round-the-clock protection of the Tribunal facilities.
 Removal of folks loitering around the tribunals.
 Arresting criminals.
 Control of business practices to prevent fraude in weights and measures.
 Defending the established rule of law, and prevention of civil unrest.
 Maintain order during ceremonies of judicial proceedings.

Puerto Rico
There were justicias mayores named in Puerto Rico in the mid 1810s. These position/titles appeared after the Spanish constitutional system was abolished. The justicias mayores performed the functions today (2019) performed by a mayor, but also many other functions as well. These district authorities had powers that included police, tax collection, justice and war. They were to preside over the ayuntamiento, carry out order from the Provincial Government, and exercise their own judgment where the laws allowed it. In Puerto Rico, the teniente justicia mayor for the Ponce District (which territory included Ponce, Coamo, and much of the southern region) was Alejandro Ordonez. The justicia mayor positions, however, did not last long because, upon the issuance of the Cédula Real (Royal Decree) of 6 June 1816, they were terminated and regular alcaldes where named instead. The naming of alcaldes lasted until 1820 when towns, like Ponce, went back to electing their own alcalde.

See also
 Alcalde
 Corregidor
 Teniente a guerra
 Sargento mayor

References
 Jaime de Salazar y Acha. La casa del Rey de Castilla y León en la Edad Media. Centro de Estudios Políticos y Constitucionales. Madrid: Rumagraf S.A. Colección Historia de la Sociedad Política. First edition. 2000. .

Reconquista
Military ranks
Military history of Spain
Spanish colonial governors and administrators
Early Modern history of Spain
14th-century establishments in Spain
1833 disestablishments
Positions of subnational authority